Walter Burdick (April 23, 1893 – March 7, 1982) was an American farmer and politician.

Burdick was born in Viola Township, Olmsted County, Minnesota. He went to the Minneapolis public schools. Burdick lived in Rochester, Minnesota, with his wife and family and was a farmer. He was a member of the Minnesota House of Representatives from 1939 to 1946 and in the Minnesota Senate from 1947 to 1958. He died at a nursing home in Rochester, Minnesota.

Notes

1893 births
1982 deaths
Politicians from Rochester, Minnesota
Farmers from Minnesota
Members of the Minnesota House of Representatives
Minnesota state senators
20th-century American politicians